Hart Blanton (Ph.D., Princeton University, 1994) is an American social psychologist.  He is now professor of communication at Texas A&M University.

Research

Blanton is known for his contributions to the field of social comparison, social influence and has also conducted research on implicit attitudes.  He is recognized for authoring Deviance Regulation Theory and psychometric analysis of the Implicit Association Test.

External links
 Blanton's TAMU Faculty profile
 Blanton's Social Psychology Network page

21st-century American psychologists
Social psychologists
Year of birth missing (living people)
Living people
University of Connecticut faculty